Anti Feminism (stylized as ∀NTI FEMINISM) is the Japanese solo musical project started by vocalist Kenzi in 1991. None of the other members are considered official. The rotating supporting members come from various parts of Japan, including Tokyo, Osaka, Sapporo, Fukuoka, and Nagoya. In 2007, Anti Feminism toured through Europe and the U.S. with Hagakure.

History
Kenzi, (ex-Kamaitachi, The Dead Pop Stars), started the project in 1991 and continued for only a few years. In 1998, Kenzi worked together with Takayuki of The Piass to revive the project. By 2006 there had been more than fifty different members. Several well-known musicians of the visual kei scene have participation, including Kisaki (Phantasmagoria, Syndrome, Mirage, etc.), Katsura (Shazna, Baiser, Vinett, etc.) and Hideaki (Das Vasser).

A noteworthy detail of Anti Feminism is Kenzi's antics at live performances. During shows, he has set off fireworks, set himself on fire, broken fluorescent light bulbs over his head, jumped onto a board covered in barbed wire, and done various other extreme stunts, consistently injuring himself and calling for hospitalization. This is highlighted at Anti Feminism's official site, with the section "Mad Performance".

Kenzi affectionately refers to fans of Anti Feminism as "Mad Family".

Current line-up
Vocals: Kenzi (drummer of The Dead Pop Stars, ex: drummer of Kamaitachi)
Guitar: Shogo
Bass: Ruiji (ex:The Piass, The Dead Pop Stars)
Drums: Shizuki

Discography

Albums and mini-albums
Kyohan Sabetsu Hinichijouteki (December 31, 2003)
Kyousouroku (狂葬録, June 25, 2008)
Nihon wa Shizumu (日本は沈む, May 2010)
''∀NTI DAMASHII (April 13, 2016)

Singles and maxi-singles
"15-Sai" (１５才, June 25, 2008)
"Malicious Power" (June 29, 2011)

Demos
"Kami ga Ataeta Futsuu de Nai Mono e no Shuudanteki Kakushinhan" (May 2, 2003)	
"Mujouken Koufuku Suru ka, Nou ka" (July 24, 2002)
"To Sick People: Boku wa Genki ni Shindemasu" (June 2001)
"Majime na Ningen wa Shinubeki de Aru (First Press)" (July 2000)
"Majime na Ningen wa Shinubeki de Aru" (July 2000)
"Japanese No" (June 27, 1999)

References

External links
Official website
We Rock Records page
∀nti Feminism · - PROFILE & BIOGRAPHY - JaME U.K.

Visual kei musical groups
Japanese hardcore punk groups
Japanese thrash metal musical groups
Crossover thrash groups
Musical groups established in 1991
1991 establishments in Japan